Diego Lord (born September 26, 1977) is an Argentine cricketer who plays for Lomas Athletic Club.  He is a right-handed batsman and a right-arm medium-fast bowler who has played for Argentina since 1997. He was born in Buenos Aires.

Lord made his ICC Trophy debut in 1997, in a defeat against Malaysia, and took one wicket, despite being out for a duck in his innings. He played four more matches during the competition, scoring just one run in all the games combined, fewer than any other Argentine batsman who played more than one game in the competition.

He returned to play in the 2001 competition, fighting for a place in the tailend with teammates Martin Cortabarria and Hernan Pereyra, and despite being present in the batting lineup was not needed to play a single innings for the team.

Lord played two games during a tour by Marylebone Cricket Club in 2001, and appeared in the 2004 Americas Championship, consistently finishing off the batting lineup with Pereyra.

Most recently, Lord has played in the 2006 ICC World Cricket League Americas Championship, playing all four matches in the Argentines' Division Two winning campaign, and during the winless Division One campaign of six months later. Lord has been a tailending batsman throughout nearly ten years in the Argentine squad. In the 2008 Americas Championship he picked up 3 for 26 from 10 overs versus Suriname.

References

External links
Diego Lord at Cricket Archive
Lomas Athletic - Official Site

1977 births
Argentine cricketers
Living people
Cricketers from Buenos Aires